Belin-Béliet is a commune in the Gironde department in southwestern France. It was created in 1974 by the merger of the former communes Belin and Béliet.

Population
The population data given in the table below for 1968 and earlier refer to the former commune of Belin.

See also
Communes of the Gironde department
Parc naturel régional des Landes de Gascogne

References

Communes of Gironde